The fourth Connecticut House of Representatives district elects one member of the Connecticut House of Representatives. The seat is held by Julio Concepcion. The district consists of part of the city of Hartford, including the neighborhoods of Charter Oak, South Meadows and Barry Square. The district is one of few in Connecticut to have a Hispanic majority population, along with the neighboring 3rd district.

List of representatives

Recent elections

External links 
 Google Maps - Connecticut House Districts

References

04
Hartford, Connecticut